

T

References